James Steven Oddo (born January 12, 1966) is an American attorney and politician who served as the Borough President of Staten Island from 2014 to 2021. Oddo had previously served as a member of the New York City Council, representing the 50th district from 1999 to 2013.

Early life and education
Oddo was born on Staten Island as the youngest of four sons in a family of city employees. He earned a Bachelor of Arts from Fordham University, and a Juris Doctor from New York Law School.

Career 
He started in politics by working as Chief of Staff to then-councilman John Fusco for seven years and as Legal Counsel to the former Council Minority Leader Thomas Ognibene.

Oddo's career as a politician began in February 1999 when he won a special election to fill the seat vacated by John Fusco. After the resignation of Tom Ognibene, he was elected Minority Leader of the City Council with the consent of the three other Republicans on the Council in 2002.

His district, the 50th, is located mainly on Staten Island and encompasses the neighborhoods of Arrochar, Bulls Head, Castleton Corners, Concord, Dongan Hills, Emerson Hill, Fort Wadsworth, Grant City, Graniteville, Grasmere, Heartland Village, Isle of Meadows, Meiers Corners, Midland Beach, New Dorp, New Springville, Oakwood, Ocean Breeze, Old Town, Prall's Island, Richmondtown, South Beach, Todt Hill, Travis, Westerleigh, and Willowbrook; but also parts of Bensonhurst, Dyker Heights and Bath Beach in Brooklyn.

On October 20, 2010, he announced he would run for the office of Staten Island Borough President in 2013. On November 5, 2013, he was elected to office with 48,168 votes (69%). He outran Democratic candidate Lou Liedy, Green Party candidate Henry Bardel, and Libertarian Party candidate Silas Johnson. His percentage of 69% was the highest ever for a non-incumbent winner of the office, beating the record set by Republican Robert Connor in 1965. James Oddo was re elected Borough President on November 7, 2017, with 75.56% of the vote.

In 2022, Oddo was named Chief of Staff to the New York City Deputy Mayor for Operations in the administration of Mayor Eric Adams.

Staten Island Bus Study

Borough President Oddo championed the Staten Island Bus Study which has recommended major service changes to Staten Island express buses. As a result of the study, express bus service to Staten Island was to be completely reorganized in August 2018. As part of the redesign, all of the existing bus routes would be discontinued and replaced with 21 new routes with a "SIM" prefix.

Norwegian comedy show incident 
Councilman Oddo received attention when a video of the councilman appeared on YouTube around October 5, 2007. In the video clip, Oddo is shown being interviewed by a film crew from the Norwegian comedy show Rikets røst (meaning "Voice of the Nation"), a show similar to The Colbert Report. The comedians had gained entry to councilman Oddo's office by posing as TV journalists who wanted to get the view of a Republican on the upcoming U.S. presidential election.

Instead, the interviewer, Pia Haraldsen, played the role of an uninformed foreigner. She asked how Barack Obama could run for president, "as he is not a U.S. citizen" (when informed by Oddo that Obama is indeed an American, she wondered about that, given that she had read somewhere that he was "African-American") and asked if Senator Clinton could be president "after that embarrassing incident with the cigar?" On the aired clip, Haraldsen cannot refrain from smiling as Oddo starts swearing at and threatening the film crew. One of the film crew's cameras continues recording the incident, as Oddo, in a profanity-laced tirade, furiously tells them to get "the fuck" out of his office and threatens to physically harm the film crew. Oddo later apologized, stating the tirade was "inappropriate" but that the sentiment beneath it was entirely appropriate, despite threatening physical harm to the film crew.

Support of Congressman Fossella 
In 2008, Oddo supported Congressman Vito Fossella, stating that he "knows what [Fossella's] core is about" and "He is my friend ... and I stand with him during the good times and I stand with him during the difficult times. What he needs to do is what he did today: Say, 'I'm ready to be held accountable and apologize and I have to heal myself, heal my relationship with my friends and family, and heal my relationship with my community.'" Fossella had been arrested for driving under the influence, was living with one woman while being married to another woman, and had fathered a child with the other woman.

2018 Surrogate Court election 

Oddo was widely believed to be running for surrogate court judge in 2018 despite running for election as Borough President in 2017. When asked about a potential surrogate court judge candidacy, Oddo stated that he honestly did not know if he would serve a full second term; this statement led critics and his main opponent in the 2017 Borough President election, Tom Shcherbenko, to argue that he should not run for Borough President if he already had one foot out the door. Oddo was re-elected Borough President in 2017. Oddo ultimately chose not to run for Surrogate Court Judge.

Views towards Muslims

In 2010, when developers planned to build a Muslim community center and mosque in Lower Manhattan, Oddo said he understood the outrage of families opposed to building a Muslim place of worship within a mile of the World Trade Center.

Later that year, when a Catholic church planned to sell a convent to a group intending to use the building for a mosque, Oddo said that he would oppose the plan until the "responsible leadership of the Muslim community wholeheartedly, full-throatedly condemns the extremists of their religion."

In 2005, Oddo said that police officers conducting random security searches on the New York subway system was not enough. Instead, he wanted police officers to prioritize the searching of young Muslim men.

References

External links
NYC Council: District 50 - James S. Oddo
Longer version of Norwegian show Rikets røst including more of James Oddo interview
Exploding New York City Councilman Refuses To Get 'Punked' (Fox News, 2007)

1966 births
American people of Italian descent
Fordham University alumni
Living people
New York City Council members
New York Law School alumni
New York (state) Republicans
People from Staten Island
Staten Island borough presidents
Monsignor Farrell High School alumni